Nicholas Blane is an English actor.

Career
He is best known for his roles in stage productions such as Year of the Rat, See How They Run and Democracy.

He has appeared in numerous British television and film projects, including Coronation Street (1993–2010), Heartbeat (1993–1998), Trial & Retribution (1997–2002), Dalziel and Pascoe (1997), Life Force, Sharpe's Challenge (2006) and The Great Fire (2014). He played the role of Wopsle in the BBC adaptation of Great Expectations (1999) and he appeared in minor roles in The Illusionist (2006) and Harry Potter and the Order of the Phoenix (2007).

In 2012 he starred as the Spice King in the second season of the HBO TV series Game of Thrones.

Selected filmography

Film

Television

References

External links 
 

20th-century English male actors
21st-century English male actors
Living people
English male television actors
English male film actors
English male stage actors
Year of birth missing (living people)
Place of birth missing (living people)